The 1923 Centre Praying Colonels football team represented Centre College in the 1923 college football season. The Praying Colonels scored 140 points while allowing 40 points and finished 7–1–1.

Schedule

References

Centre
Centre Colonels football seasons
Centre Praying Colonels football